André Silva Carvalho (born 18 September 1984 in Itabuna) is a Brazilian football player. He currently plays for NK Imotski in Druga HNL.

References

External links
 Profile at NK Imotski
 Brazilian FA Database
 hnl-statistika

1984 births
Living people
Brazilian footballers
Brazilian expatriate footballers
Expatriate footballers in Bosnia and Herzegovina
NK Široki Brijeg players
Association football defenders
Sportspeople from Bahia
NK Imotski players